Love Crazy is an album by American R&B group The Miracles featuring singer Billy Griffin, released via Columbia Records in 1977. The album is the first of two albums released on their new label following their departure from Motown.

Background 
When the group's contract with Motown had expired, they were advised to "wait for six months" to discuss a new contract, but instead, the group took on an offer to sign with Columbia Records. Following this, Billy Griffin's brother Donald Griffin joined them on lead guitar, replacing Marv Tarplin. The group immediately had problems after signing with Columbia, starting with the release of their first single on Columbia, "Spy For Brotherhood". Columbia expected controversy from the single as well as possible threats from the FBI and the CIA, and thus they withdrew the song from the airwaves, leading to the failure of the single and the album to become big hits.

Track listing

Personnel 
Adapted from Discogs.

Musicians

The Miracles:

 Billy Griffin – lead vocals, guitar
 Pete Moore – backing vocals, lead vocals (track: "Too Young")
 Ronnie White – backing vocals
 Bobby Rogers – backing vocals
 Donald Griffin – guitar

Session musicians:

 Julia Tillman, Maxine Willard, Myrna Matthews – backing vocals
 Willie Weeks – bass
 James Gadson – drums
 Eddie "Bongo" Brown – bongos, congas
 Jack Ashford – percussion
 John Barnes – keyboards, synthesizer
 Jackie Kelso – tenor saxophone (track: "Too Young")
 Buell Neidlinger – contrabass (track: "Too Young")

Production

 Pete Moore – producer, vocal arrangements
 Billy Griffin – vocal arrangements
 John Barnes – rhythm arrangements, strings and horns arrangements
 The Whizz Kids (Bill Griffin, James Barnes, Kevin Beamish, Wade Marcus) – co-producer (production assistant)
 Wade Marcus – strings and horns arrangements
 Daniel Wyman – synthesizer programmer
 Kevin Beamish – recording engineer
 Jeff Sanders – mastering engineer
 Charles Veal – strings and horns contractor
 Ivy Skoff – production coordinator
 Alan Bergman – photographer
 Marty Pichinson – manager

Charts

References

External links 
 Love Crazy on Discogs.
 Love Crazy on AllMusic.

The Miracles albums
1977 albums
Disco albums by American artists
Funk albums by American artists
Columbia Records albums